Ambrose McGuigan was a member of the Wisconsin State Assembly. McGugian was elected to the Assembly in 1890, representing the 11th District of Milwaukee County, Wisconsin. He was a Democrat. McGuigan was born on April 20, 1834 in what was then County Londonderry, Ireland.

References

People from County Londonderry
Irish emigrants to the United States (before 1923)
Democratic Party members of the Wisconsin State Assembly
Politicians from Milwaukee
1834 births
Year of death missing